Begluci is a village in Croatia.

Population

According to the 2011 census, Begluci had 61 inhabitants.

Note: In 1857 and 1869 this settlement was part of Bosnia and Herzegovina (that time Ottoman Empire), without census data, so population number is calculated. 1880, 1890 and 1900 data are taken from Bosnia and Herzegovina censuses (under occupation control of Austria-Hungary) from 1879, 1885 and 1895. The settlement of Begluci became part of the Yugoslav federal unit of Croatia after World War II.

1991 census

According to the 1991 census, settlement of Begluci had 235 inhabitants, which were ethnically declared as:

Austro-hungarian 1910 census

According to the 1910 census, settlement of Begluci had 441 inhabitants, which were linguistically and religiously declared as this:

Note: In 1910 census settlement of Begluci was in Bosnia and Herzegovina.

Literature 

  Savezni zavod za statistiku i evidenciju FNRJ i SFRJ, popis stanovništva 1948, 1953, 1961, 1971, 1981. i 1991. godine.
 Knjiga: "Narodnosni i vjerski sastav stanovništva Hrvatske, 1880-1991: po naseljima, author: Jakov Gelo, izdavač: Državni zavod za statistiku Republike Hrvatske, 1998., ;

References

Populated places in Zadar County